Bottesford Town Football Club is a football club based in Bottesford, Lincolnshire, England.

History
The club were established in 1974 and joined the Lincolnshire League. In 1977–78 they finished bottom of the Premier Division, but were not relegated as it was expanded from 14 to 16 clubs. However, after finishing second-from-bottom the following season, they were relegated to Division One. In 1987 the league was reduced to a single division, which the club became members of.

In 1986–87 they won the League Cup, a feat they repeated in 1988–89 and 1989–90. The latter season also saw them win the league for the first time, and they went on to retain the title for the next two seasons. They were runners-up in 1993–94, and in 2000 they joined the Premier Division of the Central Midlands League. After finishing third in their first season in the division, they were promoted to the Supreme Division. However, they were relegated back to the Premier Division at the end of the 2002–03 season after finishing bottom of the Supreme Division.

In 2005–06 Bottesford finished third in the Premier Division, earning promotion to the Supreme Division. The following season saw them crowned league champions, resulting in promotion to Division One of the Northern Counties East League. In 2015–16 they finished third, qualifying for the promotion playoffs. After beating Hallam 2–0 in the semi-finals, they won the final against AFC Emley 4–3 on penalties following a 1–1 draw to earn promotion to the Premier Division.

Ground
The club initially played on pitches at the Frederick Gough School in Scunthorpe, before moving to Birch Park in 1983 when a lease on the site was granted by the local council. It currently has a capacity of 1,000, of which 90 is seated and 300 covered.

Honours
Central Midlands League
Supreme Division champions 2006–07
Lincolnshire League
Champions 1989–90, 1990–91, 1991–92
League Cup winners 1986–87, 1988–89, 1989–90

Records
Best FA Cup performance: First qualifying round, 2010–11, 2017-18, 2018-19
Best FA Vase performance: Third round, 2016–17

See also
Bottesford Town F.C. players

References

External links
Official website

Football clubs in England
Football clubs in Lincolnshire
Association football clubs established in 1974
1974 establishments in England
Lincolnshire Football League
Central Midlands Football League
Northern Counties East Football League